Charles Ainsworth (1885 – 1955) was a footballer who played in The Football League for Derby County and Grimsby Town. He also played for Queens Park Rangers.

References

English footballers
Derby County F.C. players
Grimsby Town F.C. players
Queens Park Rangers F.C. players
English Football League players
1885 births
1955 deaths
Association football outside forwards